Phantom Navigator is the seventeenth album by jazz saxophonist Wayne Shorter, that was released on Columbia in 1986.

Reception
The Allmusic review by Richard S. Ginell awarded the album 1.5 stars stating "On a sheer technical level, Wayne's soprano and tenor work is alright, yet on "Yamanja" he does a depressingly mechanical sounding turn on a lyricon. Pass this right by."

Track listing 
All compositions by Wayne Shorter.

 "Condition Red" – 5:08  
 "Mahogany Bird" – 6:10  
 "Remote Control" – 7:55  
 "Yamanja" – 6:28  
 "Forbidden, Plan-It!" – 6:09  
 "Flagships" – 6:35

Personnel 
Musicians
 Wayne Shorter – soprano saxophone, tenor saxophone (1, 3, 5, 6), lyricon (4)
 Erik Hansen – synthesizer programming 
 Paul Heckert – additional synthesizer programming 
 Mitchel Forman – synthesizers (1), acoustic piano (4, 6), additional keyboards (4, 6)
 Chick Corea – acoustic piano (2)
 Stu Goldberg – synthesizers (2, 4, 5, 6), additional keyboards (3)
 Jim Beard – synthesizers (3, 5)
 Jeff Bova – synthesizers (3)
 Gary Willis – bass guitar (1), electric bass (2)
 John Patitucci – acoustic bass (2), bass guitar (4, 5)
 Alphonso Johnson – bass guitar (3)
 Tom Brechtlein – drums (1)
 Jimmy Bralower – drums (3), percussion programming (3)
 Scott Roberts – percussion (2, 4, 5, 6), drum programming (4, 5)
 Bill Summers – percussion (2, 4, 5), drum programming (4, 5)
 Ana Maria Shorter – intro vocals (4)
 Gregor Goldberg – vocals (6)

Production
 Wayne Shorter – producer, illustration
 George Butler – executive producer 
 K2 – co-producer, engineer, mixing  
 Duncan Aldrich – assistant engineer (1, 2, 4, 5, 6)
 Gary Duncan – assistant engineer (1, 2, 4, 5, 6)
 Steve Krause – mix assistant (1, 2, 4, 5, 6)
 Michael Christopher – assistant engineer (3)
 Bob Ludwig – mastering 
 Nancy Donald – art direction 
 Tony Lane – art direction 
 Jean-Francois Podevin – illustration

Studios
 Recorded and Mixed at The Power Station (New York City, New York) and Mad Hatter Studios (Los Angeles, California).
 Mastered at Masterdisk (New York City, New York).

References

1987 albums
Wayne Shorter albums
Columbia Records albums